Tropical Snow is a 1988 American drama film directed by Ciro Durán and starring David Carradine, Madeleine Stowe, and Jsu Garcia. The plot concerns cocaine smuggling. It was Tim Allen's film debut. He went on to star in many successful films.

References

External links

1989 films
1989 drama films
Colombian drama films
American drama films
Films about drugs
Spanish drama films
Paramount Pictures films
Films set in the United States
1980s English-language films
1980s American films